Hugh C. Benner (1899–1975) was a minister and general superintendent in the Church of the Nazarene. He started the history department at the Eastern Nazarene College in 1921, and Benner Hall and Benner Library on the campus of Olivet Nazarene University are named after him. Dr. Benner was born near Marion, Ohio. Dr. Benner was ordained in 1923 by Nazarene General Superintendent Roy T. Williams. After serving the Church as a college professor and later as a pastor at Santa Monica, California; Spokane, Washington; and Kansas City First Church, Dr. Benner was elected the first president of the Nazarene Theological Seminary in 1944. He was elected general superintendent in 1952 and served in this position until retirement in 1968. He was general superintendent emeritus until his death in 1975 in Leawood, Kansas.

References 

1899 births
1975 deaths
American Nazarene ministers
Eastern Nazarene College faculty
Nazarene General Superintendents
Olivet Nazarene University alumni
People from Marion, Ohio
Presidents of Nazarene Theological Seminary
Seminary presidents